Christine Elise McCarthy (born February 12, 1965), professionally known as Christine Elise, is an American film and television actress. She is best known for her roles as Emily Valentine in Beverly Hills, 90210 and BH90210 and Kyle in the Child's Play franchise, first appearing in Child's Play 2 (1990) and reprising the role in Cult of Chucky (2017) and the Syfy series Chucky (2021–present).

Personal life
Born in Boston, Massachusetts, and raised in Roslindale, the daughter of artists, she graduated from the Boston Latin School in 1983. She and fellow 90210 actor Jason Priestley lived together from 1992 to 1997. She is a vegan.

Career

Film career
Early in her career, Elise had a recurring role in the final season of China Beach which she often cites as her best professional experience. She played the role of Kyle in the 1990 film Child's Play 2. In 1993, she played Jenn Platt in the horror film Body Snatchers. She had a recurring role as Emily Valentine on Beverly Hills, 90210 and also appeared on the second season of ER for 17 episodes as Harper Tracy.

Following her stint on ER, Elise appeared on the short-lived Fox show L.A. Firefighters. She appeared in the TV movie Vanishing Point with Viggo Mortensen, who had requested that she play the role. They had met on another project, Boiling Point, though her role was largely written out. She had a recurring role as the daughter of Police Chief Bill Gillespie on In the Heat of the Night and also appeared in the Charmed episode Desperate Housewitches. She was featured in the punk rock documentaries American Hardcore and All Ages: The Boston Hardcore Film.

McCarthy made her directorial debut with an award-winning short film she also wrote, produced, and starred in: Bathing and the Single Girl. Since December 2010, Bathing and the Single Girl has been screened at more than 100 festivals and has won 20 awards. Dystel & Goderich Literary Management represents her full-length novel of the same name, Bathing and the Single Girl, released in January 2014.

McCarthy has also been a programmer of Michigan's Waterfront Film Festival since it was founded in 1999. She has also been involved in multiple capacities (juror, panelist, programmer, and moderator) with Sidewalk FF, Indie Memphis FF, Oxford FF, RxSM FF, Victoria Texas Independent FF, Kansas City Jubilee FF, Lady Filmmakers FF, and Portland Oregon Women's FF.

McCarthy has also worked as a story producer since 2014, producing such reality shows as Hellevator (with the Soska Twins), Best Bars in America, Cold Justice, Tamar & Vince, and Rich in Faith.

On February 11, 2015, McCarthy appeared on Ken Reid's TV Guidance Counselor Podcast.

Elise revisited her role as Emily Valentine from Beverly Hills, 90210 in the reboot, BH90210 in 2019 playing a "heightened version" of herself on the series. She has said in interviews that she was approached to be involved in a spin off for her Emily Valentine character, as the original idea for the show Melrose Place, but she turned it down.

Elise reprised her role of Kyle from Child's Play 2 and Cult of Chucky in the 2021 SYFY & USA Network series - Chucky - helmed by Child's Play franchise creator Don Mancini.  The series premiered October 12, 2021.

Career outside film industry
Under her birth name (Christine Elise McCarthy), she has worked as a professional photographer, once (February 2008) showing her work at the 2nd Cup Cafe in Boston. In 2008, her photographs were displayed at the Paris restaurant Pink Flamingo. In April 2009, she participated in the Cambridge, Massachusetts, exhibit called "Burlesque As Art".

Elise maintains a food porn blog called Delightful-Delicious-Delovely and a vegan cooking show on YouTube.

Filmography

Film

Television

References

External links

Her YouTube cooking show - Delightful Delicious Delovely
Bathing and the Single Girl the NOVEL
Her Food Blog
Christine McCarthy Photography
Follow her on Instagram
Bathing and the Single Girl the FILM

American film actresses
American television actresses
20th-century American actresses
Living people
Actresses from Boston
American photographers
Boston Latin School alumni
21st-century American actresses
21st-century American women photographers
21st-century American photographers
Year of birth missing (living people)